Macron below is a combining diacritical mark that is used in various orthographies.

The difference between "macron below" and "low line" is that the latter results in an unbroken underline when it is run together: compare a̱ḇc̱ and a̲b̲c̲ (only the latter should look like abc).

Unicode

Macron below character
Unicode defines several characters for the macron below:

There are many similar marks covered elsewhere:
 Spacing underscores, including
 
 
 Combining underlines, including
 
 
 ;
 
 
 
 International Phonetic Alphabet mark for retracted or backed articulation:

Precomposed characters
Various precomposed letters with a macron below are defined in Unicode:

Note that the Unicode character names of precomposed characters whose decompositions contain  use "WITH LINE BELOW" rather than "WITH MACRON BELOW".

The Vietnamese đồng currency sign resembles a lower case d with a stroke and macron below:  but is neither a letter nor decomposable.

See also
Underscore
Macron

References

Latin-script diacritics
Aramaic languages
Arabic language